Raul Alejandro Celis Sanzotti (born 12 January 1975) is an Argentine retired footballer who played as goalkeeper.

International career
Sanzotti played for the Argentina national under-17 football team at 1991 FIFA U-17 World Championship.

References

External links
 Raul Sanzotti at BDFA.com.ar 
 

1975 births
Living people
Argentine footballers
Argentine expatriate footballers
Association football goalkeepers
Sportspeople from Córdoba Province, Argentina
Cobresal footballers
Deportes Concepción (Chile) footballers
Argentinos Juniors footballers
Defensores de Belgrano footballers
Club Atlético Belgrano footballers
Huracán de Tres Arroyos footballers
Argentine Primera División players
Expatriate footballers in Chile
Argentine expatriate sportspeople in Chile
Argentina youth international footballers